Bourg-des-Comptes (Gallo: Bórg-Cons) is a commune in the Ille-et-Vilaine department in Brittany in northwestern France.

Geography
The river Semnon forms all of the commune's southern border, then flows into the Vilaine, which forms all of its western border.

Population

Inhabitants of Bourg-des-Comptes are called Bourgcomptois in French.

See also
Communes of the Ille-et-Vilaine department
Jean-Marie Valentin

References

External links

Official website 

Mayors of Ille-et-Vilaine Association 

Communes of Ille-et-Vilaine